Three Lock Box is the seventh studio album by American rock vocalist Sammy Hagar, released on November 30, 1982 by Geffen Records. This album has appearances by Loverboy's Mike Reno, Journey's Jonathan Cain and Mr. Mister's Richard Page. The album peaked at number 17 on the Billboard 200 album charts on April 9, 1983. His only top 20 solo hit, "Your Love Is Driving Me Crazy", reached #13 on the Billboard Hot 100 in 1983 and #3 on the Billboard Mainstream Rock songs chart.

Song information
 The lyrics to the title track presented a story with a more philosophical bent: "It's got to do with deep sea diving, when you look for a buried treasure. The ultimate treasure would be a sunken treasure with three locks on it, because that means it was the most valuable stuff that the queen had on that ship. And you need three different guys with keys to open it, that way no one could steal it. So a 'Three Lock Box' to me is within yourself. If you unlock the treasure of your physical, and your mental and your spiritual potential - those three in balance - you are a real human being and almost godly."

Track listing

Personnel

Band
 Sammy Hagar – lead vocals, guitar
 Bill Church – bass guitar
 Gary Pihl – guitar
 David Lauser – drums

Guests
 Jonathan Cain – keyboards and backing vocals on "Remember the Heroes"
 Mike Reno – vocals on "Remember the Heroes"

Additional personnel
Alan Pasqua – keyboards
Patrick Gleason – sound effects
Richard Page – additional backing vocals
Tom Kelly – additional backing vocals

Singles 
 "Your Love Is Driving Me Crazy" b/w "I Don't Need Love" - US (Geffen 7-29816)
 "Your Love Is Driving Me Crazy" b/w "I Don't Need Love" - Spain (Geffen GEF A-3043)
 "Your Love Is Driving Me Crazy" b/w "I Don't Need Love" - Holland (Geffen A-3043)
 "Your Love Is Driving Me Crazy" b/w "I Don't Need Love" - US (Geffen PRO-A-1086)
 "Never Give Up" b/w "Fast Times At Ridgemont High" - US (Geffen 7-29718)
 "Never Give Up" b/w "Rise of the Animal"/"Three Lock Box" - US (Geffen PRO-A-2008)

Releases
 Geffen Records (US LP): GHS 2021
 Geffen Records (Japan): 25AP 2485
 Geffen Records (Holland): GEF 25254
 Geffen Records (US CD): 2021-1
 MCA Victor (Japan): MVCG-21005

Charts

Weekly charts

Year-end charts

Certifications

External links
 Track listing and lyrics from Hagar's official site

References

1982 albums
Sammy Hagar albums
Albums produced by Keith Olsen
Geffen Records albums